North Park University is a private Christian university in Chicago, Illinois.  It was founded in 1891 by the Evangelical Covenant Church. It is located on Chicago's north side and enrolls more than 3,000 undergraduate and graduate students.

History
The university has its origins in the founding of North Park Theological Seminary in 1891 by the Evangelical Covenant Church in Minneapolis.  In 1894, the school moved to Chicago and opened as North Park College.  It moved to its present location at the corner of Foster and Kedzie, despite its remoteness from the Loop.  It was sited close to then existing Swedish-American villages and the newly established Swedish Covenant Hospital. Old Main, the oldest building on campus, was erected and dedicated on June 16, 1894.  It is at this time that the name North Park was first used to describe the school.

The early years of North Park were marked with both struggles and successes.  Both enrollment and funding fluctuated greatly in the early years.  An interesting source of both money and headache came from P.H. Anderson, who at the time was serving as a Covenant missionary in Alaska.  Taking part in the gold rush of the time, Anderson made a massive find.  And though he donated a portion of the findings, questionable circumstances surrounded the claim that created tension among the leadership of North Park.

An early leader at that time was David Nyvall.  Nyvall served as president and teacher in the Seminary for many years.  The current seminary building, Nyvall Hall, is named after him. 

Since the early days, the school has developed and changed in many ways.  In 1958, North Park Junior College expanded from a two-year college into a four-year program, becoming North Park College. In 1997, the decision was made to again change the name of the school, and North Park University was born. Though North Park still holds on to its Swedish American past and close ties with the Evangelical Covenant Church, it is now an intercultural institution focused on diversity.  North Park describes itself as a Liberal Arts University that is Christian, city-centered, and intercultural. North Park University is accredited by the North Central Association of Colleges and Schools and the Higher Learning Commission. The seminary is additionally accredited by the Association of Theological Schools in the United States and Canada. North Park's last president, David L. Parkyn, retired at the end of the 2016-17 academic year. Carl E. Balsam was named as the interim president in June 2017, and served until August 2018.  Mary Surridge was nominated as the school's tenth president, and began her term in August 2018.

Academics
The university is organized into the following academic units:
 College of Arts and Sciences
 School of Business and Nonprofit Management
 School of Education
 School of Music, Art, and Theater
 School of Nursing and Health Sciences
 School of Professional Studies
 North Park Theological Seminary

It offers undergraduate and graduate degrees. Its most popular undergraduate majors, based on number out of 365 graduates in 2022, were:
Business Administration and Management (93)
Registered Nursing/Registered Nurse (64)
Sports, Kinesiology, and Physical Education/Fitness (34)
Psychology (30)

Athletics
The North Park athletic teams are called the Vikings. The university is a member of the Division III level of the National Collegiate Athletic Association (NCAA), primarily competing in the College Conference of Illinois and Wisconsin (CCIW) since the 1962–63 academic year. The Vikings previously competed in the Chicagoland Collegiate Athletic Conference (CCAC) of the National Association of Intercollegiate Athletics (NAIA) from 1959–60 to 1961–62.

North Park competes in 16 intercollegiate varsity sports: Men's sports include baseball, basketball, cross country, football, golf, soccer, track & field and volleyball; while women's sports include basketball, cross country, rowing, soccer, softball, tennis, track & field and volleyball.

Men's basketball
North Park has had a successful men's basketball program.  It has won five men's NCAA Men's Division III Basketball Championships since 1978, including three consecutive ones led by Michael Harper, who later played for the NBA's Portland Trail Blazers.

Men's Track and Field
North Park's Dave Valentine won the 1983 NCAA Men's Division III Outdoor Track and Field Championship in the 10,000 meters setting a Division III National Championship record held from 1983 to 1994 and setting school records in the Indoor 2 mile, 3 mile and 5,000 meters in addition to the Outdoor 5,000 meters, 10,000 meters and Marathon.

Men's soccer
North Park men's soccer ended their 2017 season with a record of 20-2-2, finishing runner-up for the National Championship title. Their decorated season included a CCIW Championship, CCIW Tournament Championship, victories all the way to the NCAA Championship game, seven All-CCIW picks (including Newcomer and Player of the Year), four All-Region picks, a First Team All American selection, and a plethora of awards for Head Coach John Born: National Coach of the Year, Regional Coach of the Year, and CCIW Coach of the Year.

Baseball
North Park baseball has shown recent success, winning CCIW titles in 2011 and 2012. Since 2010, North Park has appeared in the CCIW Tournament five times (2010–2014, 2018), winning the conference’s postseason tournament in 2012.

Club sports and intramurals
North Park fields club teams for men's and women's ultimate frisbee and men's volleyball. There is also a healthy Intramural sports program on campus.

National championships
Men's Basketball: 1978, 1979, 1980, 1985, 1987.
 
Men's Track & Field: 1983 10,000 meters.

Student Government Association

The North Park Student Government Association (SGA) sponsors many student-led organizations on campus. Some of the organizations SGA helps with include the weekly student magazine, the Vista Magazineand the North Branch literary magazine.

Publications

The North Branch 
The North Branch boasts a rich history. Established in the 1930s under the title Pegasus, numerous editions were produced to showcase student work. The publication thrived as North Park progressed from an academy to a two-year college, eventually becoming a four-year institution and receiving university status in 1997. Although the school was in a transitional period throughout much of the publication’s early years, its history was finally cohered once it was renamed The North Branch, a nod to the portion of the river that runs through the North Park campus. Active throughout the mid-2000s, the publication leaders took some time away from the project to regroup. It was eventually reintroduced into the North Park community during the 2014–15 school year, remaining active since and re-branded as The North Branch Literary and Fine Arts Journal.

The Spectrum
Formerly The North Park Press, the primary student-led publication was rebranded as The Spectrum in 2014 under the leadership of then editor-in-chief, Rob Kraft.

The Spectrum magazine is North Park University's primary and original publishing body. Student writers and editors publish articles primarily pertaining to the University but they also comment on local, national, and global issues. Since 2017, the magazine has taken a new format in which it was divided into three section: Politics, Culture, and Sports. The Spectrum hosts a website where articles can be found, as well as print publications which are released on campus periodically.

The Vista Magazine 
The Vista Magazine is a North Park student-led magazine which was founded in 2017 by Stephen Nielsen and Ricardo Huerta. This online and print magazine is led by a team of North Park students. Sympathetic to the new digital age, The Vista Magazine, also known as Vista, features new articles on their website every week. Exclusive content is also on printed magazines are available twice every semester. Vista covers student opinions on a wide range of political or religious views as well as the arts. The Vista Magazine receives its funding from SGA and works under the guidance of a faculty member.

The Nancy and G. Timothy Johnson Center for Science and Community Life
The Johnson Center for Science and Community Life was opened in September 2014. The expansion cost $57 million largely funded by Nancy and G. Timothy Johnson in a capital campaign named "Campaign North Park". The Johnson Center is considered a "state-of-the-art" addition to North Park University's science programs and is also home to Einstein Bagels. The Johnson Center has 101,000 square feet, three floors and a garden level and is located in the central area of campus. The Johnson Center is equipped with 30 science laboratories, space for student and faculty research, "Smart" technology in every classroom, and several conference rooms. The building is also dedicated for campus community life with a two-story atrium and "lobby for gathering and social interaction", offices for programs "supporting co-curricular learning, spiritual growth, vocational development, urban engagement, and campus life." The building is also equipped with communal study spaces, a prayer room, and a courtyard.

Swedish-American traditions
The Swedish–American Historical Society Archives are administered in Chicago by North Park University's Brandel Library.  The Center for Scandinavian Studies at North Park is the legal trustee. The Saint Lucy's Day festival is held each December in Anderson Chapel. The service follows many Swedish traditions and is one of the few Santa Lucia Festivals held in the Chicago area. The university has an student exchange program with Södra Vätterbygdens Folkhögskola and Jönköping University in Jönköping, Sweden.

Notable alumni
 Bill Anderson, American football player and coach
 Mari Andrew, writer and illustrator
 Del Barber, singer-songwriter and musician
 Paul Carlson, American missionary killed in Congo in 1964
 Gordon Edes, sportswriter and team historian of the Boston Red Sox
 Kathryn Edin, academic and author
 Raymond Ericson, music critic
 Nancy Faust, organist
 Stephen T. Franklin, theologian
 G. Timothy Johnson, medical journalist
 Mike Harper, basketball player
 Carl Hawkinson, state legislator
 Paul J. Marwin, politician
 James R. Thompson, former governor of Illinois
 Arthur W. Wermuth, "One-Man Army of Bataan," United States Army Officer
 Paul Zaeske, American football player
TimTheTatman, formally known as Timothy Betar, YouTube streamer and internet personality
Greg Dolezal, politician and Georgia State Senator for the 27th district in Cumming, Georgia

References

Further reading
 "A History of North Park College" by Leland Carlson 
 Swedes In America. 1638-1938 (1938) by Adolph B. Benson and Naboth Hedin, eds.  (The Swedish American Tercentenary Association. New Haven, CT: Yale University Press)

External links
 
 Official athletics website
 North Park Press – student newspaper website

 
Universities and colleges in Chicago
Universities and colleges affiliated with the Evangelical Covenant Church
Educational institutions established in 1891
Swedish migration to North America
1891 establishments in Illinois
Council for Christian Colleges and Universities
Private universities and colleges in Illinois